Mother  is a 1999 Russian feature film based on the capture of an Ovechkin family in 1988.

Plot 
This story began a long time ago. Having lost her husband, who was imprisoned for stealing coal and was killed during the escape, Polina, the mother of six children, was left without any support.

To make ends meet, Polina founded a family folk music ensemble. Soon, however, she realizes that her children were worthy of a better fate, and she makes a desperate decision to escape the Soviet Union by hijacking the commercial airliner the family was traveling aboard.

Fifteen years later, Polina is released from prison to learn that fate has scattered her children all over the country: one is illegally fighting in a bar, another is chopping coal in the Donbas.  Her oldest, Leonid, is still in a psychiatric hospital, having pretended to be mentally ill for 15 years to avoid prosecution for the hijacking.

In the final scenes, Polina again gathers her sons to free their elder brother from the hospital.

Cast
 Nonna Mordyukova as Polina
 Yelena Panova as young Polina
 Oleg Menshikov as  Leonid
 Vladimir Mashkov as Nikolay
 Yevgeny Mironov as Pavel
 Aleksei Kravchenko as Vasily
Mikhail Krylov as Yuri
 Maksim Sukhanov as special hospital's head
 Nikolai Chindyajkin as head physician
 Andrei Panin as father
 Pavel Lebeshev as icebreaker's captain  
 Roman Madyanov as  sergeant
 Bolot Beyshenaliyev as old northerner
 Natalia Soldatova as Stewardess

Awards and nominations
Winner
 Honfleur Festival of Russian Cinema —  Audience Award	(Denis Yevstigneyev)
 Kinotavr — Best Music	(Eduard Artemyev)
Nominee
 Nika Award — Best Music	(Eduard Artemyev)
 Russian Guild of Film Critics — Best Actress (Nonna Mordyukova)
 Kinotavr — Full-Length Film
 Tokyo International Film Festival — Tokyo Grand Prix

References

External links
 

Musical films based on actual events
Drama films based on actual events
Films about terrorism in Europe
Russian musical drama films
1990s musical drama films
Films scored by Eduard Artemyev
1999 drama films
1999 films